Royal Arch may refer to:

 Royal Arch (structure), erected in Dundee to commemorate a visit to the city by Queen Victoria and Prince Albert in 1844. 
 The archway leading into Solomon's Temple
Royal Arch Route, a hiking trail to the Royal Arch  natural bridge in Grand Canyon National Park.
Royal Arches (Yosemite), granite arches in Yosemite National Park.
 In Freemasonry:
 The Holy Royal Arch, an appendant Masonic degree conferred in Great Britain, and much of Europe and the Commonwealth
 Royal Arch Masonry, the equivalent Royal Arch body as practiced as a part of the York Rite